Motive power may refer to:

 In thermodynamics, natural agents such as water or steam, wind or electricity, that do work
 In mechanics, the mechanical energy associated with the motion and position of an object
 In physics, a synonym for power
 In mechanical engineering, the source of mechanical power of a propulsion system

It may also refer to:

 Motive power, a colloquial term for a railway locomotive
 Motive Power, an Australian railway magazine
 Motive power depot, a railway running shed
 Electric Motive Power, an English electric car
 MotivePower, a subsidiary of Wabtec